Annaleah Rush (born 15 April 1976) is a former female rugby union player for the Black Ferns.

Biography 
Rush represented  at the 1998 and 2002 Women's Rugby World Cup. She was a member of the first official New Zealand women's sevens team, who took part in the Hong Kong Sevens. She also played in the 2001 Hong Kong Women's Sevens tournament which New Zealand eventually won.

Rush was also part of the squad that lost to  22–17 in 2001 after ten years of being undefeated.

She is the sister of former All Black and Blues Number Eight Xavier Rush. She also won the Women's Player of the Year award in 2001.

References

1976 births
Living people
New Zealand women's international rugby union players
New Zealand female rugby union players
New Zealand women's international rugby sevens players